Michael D'Eramo (born 13 August 1999) is an Italian professional footballer who plays as a midfielder for  club Ancona-Matelica.

Club career 
Born in Atessa, D'Eramo started his career in Angolana, and played one season in Vicenza youth sector.

In 2016, he joined Serie D club Avezzano, and made his senior debut.

In 2019, he signed for Serie B club Spezia. He was loaned to Ravenna, and made his professional debut on 25 August 2019 against Fermana.

THe next year, on 3 September 2020, he signed with Vis Pesaro.

On 6 July 2021, he joined to new club Ancona-Matelica.

References

External links
 
 
 

1999 births
Living people
People from Atessa
Sportspeople from the Province of Chieti
Italian footballers
Association football midfielders
Serie C players
Serie D players
Avezzano Calcio players
Spezia Calcio players
Rimini F.C. 1912 players
Ravenna F.C. players
Vis Pesaro dal 1898 players
Ancona-Matelica players
Footballers from Abruzzo